Keeper of the Seven Keys: Part I is the second studio album by German power metal band Helloween, released in 1987. It marks the first appearance of vocalist Michael Kiske, and is considered the album that created the genre of European-style power metal.

Background 

Kai Hansen stepped away from doing vocal duties as he had difficulties singing and playing the guitar at the same time during the previous tour. It was an album dominated by Hansen, due to illness of co-guitarist Michael Weikath which prevented him from performing on much of the album. "Future World" was released as a single and a music video was made for "Halloween" but with 8 minutes omitted from the song. The band originally planned to release Keeper of the Seven Keys: Part I and Part II as a double album, but their record label refused, insisting that the albums be released separately. In 1993, both albums were released as a double CD set with bonus tracks.

Critical reception

Loudwire named the album at third in their list "Top 25 Power Metal Albums of All Time" and commented the album is "a tireless LP and perhaps the first genuine power metal album." ThoughtCo also named the album in their list "Essential Power Metal Albums."

Track listing
All songs written by Kai Hansen, except where noted.

Tracks 9, 13, and 14 also appears on "Dr. Stein" single.
Track 10 is a remix from the Treasure Chest compilation album of a re-recorded version of a song from the "Helloween" EP that was featured on the "Future World" single.
Track 11 also appear on the "Future World" single.
Track 12 also appears on the Pumpkin Box compilation album.

Personnel

Helloween
Michael Kiske - vocals
Kai Hansen - guitar, front cover concept, backing vocals
Michael Weikath - guitar, keyboards, backing vocals
Markus Grosskopf - bass, backing vocals
Ingo Schwichtenberg - drums

Production
Tommy Newton - producer, engineer
Tommy Hansen - co-producer, engineer, mixing, emulator
Edda and Uwe Karczewski - cover design
Limb - sleeve and back cover concept

Charts

Cover version 
Russian band Arktida covered the song "I'm Alive" in a single they titled "Я живой", romanized as "Ya zhivoy".

References 

Helloween albums
1987 albums
Noise Records albums